Ahn Jin-soo (born 27 June 1973) is a South Korean cross-country skier. He competed in the 1992, 1994, and 1998 Winter Olympics.

References

External links
 

1973 births
Living people
Cross-country skiers at the 1992 Winter Olympics
Cross-country skiers at the 1994 Winter Olympics
Cross-country skiers at the 1998 Winter Olympics
South Korean male cross-country skiers
Olympic cross-country skiers of South Korea
Asian Games medalists in cross-country skiing
Cross-country skiers at the 1996 Asian Winter Games
Cross-country skiers at the 1999 Asian Winter Games
Medalists at the 1999 Asian Winter Games
Asian Games bronze medalists for South Korea